Łukasz Skorupski (born 5 May 1991) is a Polish professional footballer who plays as a goalkeeper for Italian club Bologna.

Career

Early career
Born in Zabrze, started his professional career with Górnik Zabrze. In February 2011, he was loaned to Ruch Radzionków. He returned to Górnik half year later.

Roma
On 14 July 2013, Skorupski joined the Serie A club A.S. Roma, signing a four-year contract. Skorupski made his debut for Roma in the 1–0 Coppa Italia victory over Sampdoria on 9 January 2014. Skorupski's league debut came against Juventus, a 0–1 loss in the penultimate game of the season, he also played against Genoa the following, a defeat by the same scoreline.

On 30 September 2014, Skorupski made his European debut in the 1–1 Champions League draw against Manchester City.

Bologna 
On 22 June 2018, Roma confirmed they had sold Skorupski to Bologna for a reported fee of around €9 million.

International career
He was a part of Poland under-20 and under-21 squad. He made his senior national team debut against Macedonia played in Aksu in an international friendly match on 14 December 2012.

In May 2018 he was named in Poland's preliminary 35-man squad for the 2018 FIFA World Cup in Russia. However, he did not make the final 23.

Career statistics

Club

International

Personal life
On 14 June 2017, Skorupski married an Italian Matilde Rossi. On 1 June 2018, his son Leonardo was born. Skorupski's brother, Michał, is also a footballer.

Honours
AS Roma
Serie A: runner-up 2013–14, 2014–15

References

External links
 
 

1991 births
Living people
Sportspeople from Zabrze
Association football goalkeepers
Polish footballers
Poland youth international footballers
Poland under-21 international footballers
Poland international footballers
Ekstraklasa players
I liga players
Serie A players
Górnik Zabrze players
Ruch Radzionków players
A.S. Roma players
Empoli F.C. players
Bologna F.C. 1909 players
UEFA Euro 2020 players
2022 FIFA World Cup players
Polish expatriate footballers
Expatriate footballers in Italy
Polish expatriate sportspeople in Italy